Fabienne Feraez (born 6 August 1976 in Mont-de-Marsan) is a Beninese sprinter who specializes in the 200 metres. She switched nationality from her native France on August 12, 2003.

Competition record

Personal bests
100 metres - 11.55 s (2006)
200 metres - 22.81 s (2005)
400 metres - 51.47 s (2006)

All times are Beninese records. She also co-holds the Beninese record in 4 x 100 metres relay.

External links

References

1976 births
Living people
People from Mont-de-Marsan
Citizens of Benin through descent
Beninese female sprinters
Athletes (track and field) at the 2004 Summer Olympics
Athletes (track and field) at the 2008 Summer Olympics
Olympic athletes of Benin
World Athletics Championships athletes for Benin
French sportspeople of Beninese descent
Beninese people of French descent
Athletes (track and field) at the 2003 All-Africa Games
African Games competitors for Benin
Olympic female sprinters
Sportspeople from Landes (department)
Black French sportspeople